Bilicenii Noi is a commune in Sîngerei District, Moldova. It is composed of three villages: Bilicenii Noi, Lipovanca and Mîndreștii Noi.

References

Communes of Sîngerei District